Leucosyrinx subgrundifera is a species of sea snail, a marine gastropod mollusk in the family Pseudomelatomidae, the turrids.

Description
The length of the shell varies between 20 mm and 34 mm.

The sharp keel is bent away from the spire and is bent instead towards the siphonal canal.

Distribution
This marine species occurs off North Carolina to Florida, USA, and off Yucatán, Mexico.

References

 W.H. Dall (1889), A preliminary catalogue of the shell-bearing marine mollusks and brachiopods of the southeastern coast of the United States, with illustrations of many of the species; Bulletin of the United States National Museum ; no. 37

External links
 Rosenberg G., Moretzsohn F. & García E. F. (2009). Gastropoda (Mollusca) of the Gulf of Mexico, Pp. 579–699 in Felder, D.L. and D.K. Camp (eds.), Gulf of Mexico–Origins, Waters, and Biota. Biodiversity. Texas A&M Press, College Station, Texas
 Gastropods.com: Leucosyrinx subgrundifera
 

subgrundifera
Gastropods described in 1888